Bassatine Air Base  is a military air base in Meknes, Morocco. It is also known as the Second Royal Air Force Base, operated by the Royal Moroccan Air Force.

Facilities

References

External links
 

Airports in Morocco
Buildings and structures in Fès-Meknès